Commersonia craurophylla, commonly known as brittle leaved rulingia, is a species of flowering plant in the family Malvaceae and endemic to southern continental Australia. It is a dense, spreading shrub with crinkled, narrowly oblong to linear leaves, and white to cream-coloured flowers.

Description
The upper surface of the leaves has the veins imprinted, the edges are rolled under, and both surfaces are densely covered with star-shaped hairs. Flowering occurs from July to November and the fruit is a hairy, spherical capsule  in diameter.

Taxonomy
This species was first formally described in 1875 by Ferdinand von Mueller who gave it the name Rulingia craurophylla in his Fragmenta Phytographiae Australiae,
but in 1882 he transferred it to the genus, Commersonia.

The specific epithet (craurophylla) means "brittle-leaved".

Distribution and habitat
Commersonia craurophylla grows in mallee woodland and is widespread between Kalgoorlie and Esperance and Coolgardie and Lake Grace in the south-west of Western Australia, and in isolated places in the south-east of South Australia, including on the Eyre Peninsula.

References

craurophylla
Flora of South Australia
Flora of Western Australia
Plants described in 1875
Taxa named by Ferdinand von Mueller